Coma_Cose is an Italian indie pop-hip hop musical duo formed in 2017 by Fausto Lama (Fausto Zanardelli, born 1978) and California (Francesca Mesiano, born 1990).

History
They debuted in 2017 with the single "Cannibalismo", but they reached a wider audience with 2018 single "Post concerto", which achieved a gold record certification. Their debut album Hype Aura was released on 15 March 2019.

In 2020, Coma_Cose also appeared as themselves in the Netflix's series Summertime, performing the song "Mancarsi".

The duo participated at the Sanremo Music Festival 2021 with the song "Fiamme negli occhi", and again at the 2023 edition, with the song "L'addio".

Discography

Studio albums 
 Hype Aura (2019)
 Nostralgia (2021)
 Un meraviglioso modo di salvarsi (2022)

Extended plays
Inverno ticinese (2017)
Due (2020)

Singles
"Cannibalismo" (2017)
"Golgota" (2017)
"Deserto" (2017)
"Jugoslavia" (2017)
"Post concerto" (2018)
"Nudo integrale" (2018)
"Via Gola" (2018)
"Granata" (2019)
"Mancarsi" (2019)
"Guerre fredde" (2020)
"Fiamme negli occhi" (2021) (Certified 2× Platinum by FIMI)
"La canzone dei lupi" (2021)
"L'addio" (2023)

As featured artist
"Aurora sogna" with Subsonica (2019)
"Riserva naturale" with Francesca Michielin (2020)

Filmography
 Summertime (2020)

References 

Musical groups established in 2017
Italian musical duos
Musical groups from Milan
Male–female musical duos
2017 establishments in Italy
Articles with underscores in the title